Charles Alvord Bishop (May 22, 1854 – July 9, 1908) was a politician and jurist in the State of Iowa.

Biography
Bishop was born on May 22, 1854 to Roxana and Matthew Patrick Bishop in Waukesha County, Wisconsin. He married twice: first, on November 2, 1873 to Della M. Dow, who died in 1900, and second, on June 24, 1902 to Alice S. Lyman. He died in 1908.

Career
Bishop served in the Iowa House of Representatives in 1882. He served as a judge in the district court of Iowa from 1889 to 1890 and from 1895 to 1902. From 1902 to 1908 he was a justice of the Iowa Supreme Court.

References

People from Waukesha County, Wisconsin
Members of the Iowa House of Representatives
Iowa state court judges
Justices of the Iowa Supreme Court
1854 births
1908 deaths
19th-century American politicians
19th-century American judges